Crack Star Flash (stylized as CRACK STAR FLASH) is the fifth album of Japanese rock band, Granrodeo. It was released on 10 October 2012.

Song Information 
 "Ai no Warrior" was used as the opening theme to the 2011 Game Angelique: Maren no Rokukishi.
 "Can Do" was used as the 1st opening theme to the 2012 anime television "Kuroko's Basketball".
 "RIMFIRE" was used as the 2nd opening theme to the 2012 anime television "Kuroko's Basketball".
 "HAPPY LIFE" was added as an insert song for the single "Ai no Warrior".
 "Mesmerise" was added as an insert song for the single "Can Do".
 "Urban Sweet" was added as an insert song for the single "RIMFIRE".

Track listing

Personnel 
 Kishow: vocals, lyrics
 E-Zuka: lead guitar, backing vocals, Arranging

Cover 
FLOW covered "Can Do" on their 15th anniversary tour Anime Shibari in 2018.

"Can Do" and "Mesmerize" were covered by Dempagumi.inc and Mucc respectively, on the 2020 Granrodeo tribute album Rodeo Freak.

Charts

References
Official mobile site
初回限定盤
通常盤

2012 albums
Granrodeo albums